Feisal Salum Abdalla, known as Fei Toto (born 11 January 1998) is a Tanzanian professional footballer who plays as a midfielder for Tanzanian Premier League club Young Africans.

International
He played at the 2017 CECAFA Cup with the Zanzibar national football team.

He made his Tanzania national football team debut on 16 October 2018 in an AFCON qualifier against Cape Verde.

He was selected for Tanzania's 2019 Africa Cup of Nations squad.

References

External links
 
 

1998 births
Living people
Zanzibari footballers
Zanzibar international footballers
Tanzanian footballers
Tanzania international footballers
Association football midfielders
Young Africans S.C. players
2019 Africa Cup of Nations players
Tanzanian Premier League players
Tanzania A' international footballers
2020 African Nations Championship players